Australians (also known as Michael Willesee's Australians) is a thirteen part anthology documentary drama series which screened on the Seven Network in 1988.

There was a spin-off book.

The series was not the idea of Willesee's but his company, Transmedia was involved.

Episodes
The episodes, with one exception, focused on famous individuals:
Mary Mackillop⁣ – starring Lorna Lesley
Errol Flynn⁣ – starring Christopher Stollery
Lola Montez
Betty Cuthbert
Lottie Lyell⁣ – starring Odile de Clezio
Jack Davey⁣ – starring Rhys McConnochie
Les Darcy⁣ – starring Peter Phelps
Private John Simpson⁣ – starring Robert Willox
Clyde Fenton
Vivian Bullwinkle⁣ – tarring Rachel Ward
John Norton
Gordon Bennett
The only one that did not focus on Soldier Settlers.

Ep One – Les Darcy
March 1, 1988. Written by John Upton, directed by Kevin Dobson.

Cast
Peter Phelps as Les Darcy
Gia Carides as Winnie O'Sullivan
Gus Mecurio as Tex Rickard
Robin Howering as William Hughes

Reception
The Age called it "a thumbnail sketch".

Ep Two – Private John Simpson
March 8, 1988. Written by Roger McDonald. Directed by Henri Safran.

Cast
Robert Willox as John Simpson

Ep Three - Vivian Bullwinkle
March 15, 1988. Written by Anne Brooksbank. Directed by Rod Hardy.

Cast
Rachel Ward as Vivian Bullwinkle
Barry Quinn as Private Kinsley

Ep Four - Mary MacKillop
March 22, 1988. Written by John Misto. Directed by Mark Callan.

Ep Five - Lotte Lyell
March 29, 1988. Written by Anne Brooksbank. Directed by Ben Lewin

Ep Six - Lola Montez
April 5, 1988. Written by Tony Morphett. Directed by Ian Gilmour.

Cast
Linda Cropper as Lola Montez
Nicholas Eadie
Peter Whitford
Danny Adcock as Harry Seekamp

Ep Seven - Clyde Fenton
April 12, 1988. Directed by John Power.

Cast
Scott Burgess
Kerry Armstrong
Bruce Spence

Ep Eight - Jack Davey
April 19, 1987. Written by Geoffrey Atherden. Directed by George Whaley.

Ep Nine - Betty Cuthbert
April 26, 1988. Written by Denise Morgan. Directed by Kathy Mueller.

Ep Ten - Gordon Bennett
May 3, 1988. Written by John Misto.

Ep Eleven - Soldier Settlers
May 10, 1988. Directed by George Ogilvie.

Ep Twelve - John Norton
May 17, 1988.

Ep Thirteen - Errol Flynn
May 24, 1988. Written by John Lonie. Directed by Michael Carson.

Cast
Christopher Stollery as Errol Flynn
Nell Schofield
Timothy Conigrave
Terence Donovan
Rhys McConnochie
Jeanette Cronin

See also 
 List of Australian television series

References

External links

 Australians at the Australian Television Information Archive

1988 Australian television series debuts
Australian Broadcasting Corporation original programming